Laura Bernal may refer to:

 Laura Bernal (diplomat) (1956–2020), Argentine diplomat
 Laura Bernal (tennis) (born 1978), Paraguayan tennis player